Mykola Mykolayovych Oleschuk (born 25 May 1972) is a Ukrainian three-star general who has served as the Commander of the Ukrainian Air Force since 9 August 2021.

Biography 
He was born in Lutsk on 25 May 1972.

He graduated from the Zhytomyr Radio-Technical Institute in 1994. In 2004, he graduated from Kharkiv National University with distinction and in 2010, he graduated from the Ivan Chernyakhovsky National Defense University of Ukraine. During his service in the Ukrainian Air Force, he specialized on the S-300 missile system.

He was appointed commander of the Ukrainian Air Force on 9 August 2021.

On 14 October 2021, he was promoted to the rank of Lieutenant general.

References

Notes 

Ivan Chernyakhovsky National Defense University of Ukraine alumni
1972 births
Living people
Ukrainian military personnel of the 2022 Russian invasion of Ukraine
Air force generals